Mike Hill is an American university sports administrator.  He is the athletic director at the University of North Carolina at Charlotte.

Career
Before arriving in Charlotte, Hill was a member of the University of Florida athletics department for 25 years, where he started as a marketing coordinator in 1993 and eventually moved on to become the executive associate athletics director for external affairs. While at Florida, Hill was part of a search team that hired coaches such as Billy Donovan, Mike White and Jim McElwain.

On February 28, 2018, Hill was named the athletics director at Charlotte, replacing Judy Rose, who had served at the post since 1990 before announcing her retirement in January 2018. Hill officially began on March 15, 2018. Hill's contract terms were extended after the successful 2019 football season.

On October 21, 2021 Hill presided over Charlotte joining 5 other Conference USA teams in moving to the American Athletic Conference, joining former Metro Conference and C-USA rivals there.

References

External links
 Charlotte profile

Living people
Ball State University people
Charlotte 49ers athletic directors
People from Clemson, South Carolina
University of Florida people
University of North Carolina at Chapel Hill alumni
1968 births